A  (pl. ) is a typical Brazilian fast-food dish, consisting of half-circle or rectangle-shaped thin crust pies with assorted fillings, fried in vegetable oil. The result is a crispy, brownish fried pie. The most common fillings are ground meat, mozzarella, catupiry, heart of palm, codfish, cream cheese, chicken and small shrimp. Pastéis with sweet fillings such as guava paste with Minas cheese, banana and chocolate also exist. The pastel is classified in Brazilian cuisine as a salgado (savoury snack). It is traditionally sold on the streets, in open-air marketplaces, or in fast-food shops known as pastelarias. It is popularly said to have originated when Chinese immigrant adapted their traditional spring rolls to the Brazilian taste using local ingredients. The recipe was later popularized by Japanese immigrants that during World War II tried to pretend to be Chinese to escape from the prejudice Japanese people were facing because of the Japanese alliance during the war. Another theory was that Japanese immigrants adapted Chinese fried wontons to sell as snacks at weekly street markets. A common beverage to drink with pastéis is caldo de cana, a sugarcane juice.

See also 
 Pastel
 List of Brazilian dishes

References 

Brazilian cuisine
Pastries
Chinese Brazilian
Brazilian desserts
Chinese fusion cuisine